The Middle-Class Millionaire:  The Rise of the New Rich and How They are Changing America (Doubleday) is a book that chronicles the evolution of America's middle class over the last twenty years, observing how a portion of the middle class is pulling away from the rest by amassing significant wealth.

Overview 
Written by Lewis Schiff (The Armchair Millionaire) and Russ Allen Prince (Cultivating the Middle-class Millionaire: Why Financial Advisors Are Failing Their Wealthy Clients and What They Can Do About It), the book introduces an entirely new way of understanding why certain trends are gaining momentum and where that will lead next.

The book shows us how this subset of America, labeled by the authors as "the Middle-Class Millionaire", manages to thrive with one foot in the world they came from (the middle class) and one foot in the world they now inhabit (the wealthy).

The Middle-Class Millionaire is based on extensive personal interviews with more than 3,500 American households in 2006. It provides a three-dimensional portrait of a previously unrecognized demographic group: the emerging affluent middle class.

Key concepts 
Millionaire's Intelligence: There are four behaviors that middle-class millionaires exhibit that appear to be linked to their success. These qualities have origins in classic middle-class values, but are applied in uncommon ways.

The Influence of Affluence: Because the middle-class millionaire is both willing and able to try new things (products, services, places and ways to live, etc.), they are an important indicator of how the world might be changing in the years to come. As Milton Friedman, the Nobel Prize–winning economist, once suggested, when it comes to innovation, the rich work for the poor.

The Hierarchy of Values: It's easy to understand where the new rich are going to have the greatest impact when you understand their hierarchy of values. They share these values with the rest of the middle class.

References

External links 
 Official Site Middle Class Millionaire

2008 non-fiction books
American middle class
American upper class
Doubleday (publisher) books
Income in the United States
Wealth in the United States